Suratgarh railway station is a main railway station in Sri Ganganagar district, Rajasthan. Its code is SOG. It serves Suratgarh city. The station consists of four platforms, none of which is well sheltered. It lacks many facilities, including water and sanitation. The station lies on the Jodhpur–Bathinda line and is well connected to the rest of India. Ranked Top ten in country in Station Cleanliness Survey 2019.

Major trains 

Some of the important trains that services Suratgarh are:

 Bhavnagar Terminus–Udhampur Janmabhoomi Express
 Jammu Tawi–Ahmedabad Express
 Avadh Assam Express
 Barmer–Haridwar Link Express
 Kalka–Barmer Chandigarh Express
 Delhi Sarai Rohilla–Bikaner Express (via Sri Ganganagar)
 Sri Ganganagar–Tiruchirappalli Humsafar Express
 Bikaner–Bilaspur Antyodaya Express
 Hazur Sahib Nanded–Shri Ganganagar Weekly Express
 Kochuveli–Shri Ganganagar Junction Express

References

Railway stations in Sri Ganganagar district
Bikaner railway division
Railway junction stations in Rajasthan